Benvid-e Olya (also Romanized as Benvīd-e ‘Olyā; also known as Bambīz-e Bālā, Benavīd-e Bālā, Benoyd-e-’Olyā, and Benvīd-e Bālā) is a village in Bafran Rural District, in the Central District of Nain County, Isfahan Province, Iran. At the 2006 census, its population was 331, in 97 families.

References 

Populated places in Nain County